Queer Free is a 1981 novel by Alabama Birdstone. It is about a right-wing takeover of the American government by the "New Right", a religiously fundamentalist organization, which sentences gays and lesbians to extermination camps. It received mixed critical reception in the gay press and by LGBT academics.

Background and publication 
Although gay men were violently persecuted under Nazi Party rule in Germany, there have been fears of mass killings and genocides of gay people for centuries. Queer Free was published within this eradication-fearing literary milieu, and both before and after its publication, there were prominent fears of the government obliterating gay life within the United States by its right wing. 

The book is about the formation of an American fascist, religiously fundamentalist, right-wing social movement called the "New Right". It takes control of the United States and (through the President's Commission on Sodomites) establishes extermination camps for gays and lesbians. 

Alabama Birdstone finished writing Queer Free in 1978. In 1981, Calamus Books, a press in New York, published it and sold it for $6.

Reception 
Writing for the Bay Area Reporter in the year of the novel's publication, literary critic Frank J. Howell said that the book had serious flaws—it was not believable in the slightest—and he understood why Calamus Books, a small press, had published it instead of a mainstream one. LGBT academics Eric Garber and Lyn Paleo gave Queer Free a mixed review, saying that while the artistic vision of the novel was "strong", there were issues with "characterization and plot development". They compared the novel to the works of Tim Barrus and Orson Welles. By contrast, even though they accepted that the novel seemed "poorly edited" and more like "an initial rough draft", Dimid Hayes and Michael Glover said that the novel indicated a reality for LGBT people in America: "we're not safe". Similarly, Ian Young wrote in 1981 that "in light of recent events", a large-scale persecution of LGBT people was possible, and Queer Free (though poorly-written) attempted to demonstrate what a crack-down on gay life would look like.

Notes and references

Notes

Citations

Bibliography

 
 
 
 
 
 
 
 

1980s LGBT novels
1981 American novels
Apocalyptic novels
Homophobia in fiction
Works published under a pseudonym
Calamus Books books